Bomben may refer to:

 Ryan Bomben
 12834 Bomben